Sabak is a village in Silifke district of Mersin Province, Turkey. The population of the village was 456 as of 2012. The main economic activity is farming. Fruits especially figs and pomegranate are the major crops.

References

Villages in Silifke District